is a variety show aired on Japan's TV Tokyo network. The first episode was broadcast on April 3, 2009. It features comics from Shueisha's weekly and monthly manga anthologies (Weekly Shōnen Jump, V Jump and Jump Square) and their associated anime and games. It changed to jumpolice in march in 2014.

Characters
He has a Toothbrush moustache.
 , the leader and mascot of the Amezari Pirates. He appears as a parrot with a pirate hat.
 Aki Kanada as the Narrator.

 Mao Ichimichi hosted a segment called Informational Corner which ran from 2010 to 2014
 Hikarigoke (played by Yūsuke Katayama and Kazumasa Kunisawa)

Main corner

Hikarigoke Katayama's Corner
Rock Lee Exercises!
Katayama practices the Rock Lee exercises shown in Naruto'''s Rock Lee & His Ninja Pals spin-off. They dance at the opening of this program. There are 3 types of exercises.
Rock Lee Katayama's Super Training Series!
Katayama trains several trainings posted by viewers. After failing many times, new exercises are started from April 6, 2012.

Zarigani Pirates' Corner
Zarigani Pirates! The Road for Yu-Gi-oh! Card World Battleship!
This segment began when Yu-Gi-Oh! was featured early in the series. When it was aired, the corner primarily showed Zaripai (who was aiming for the Yu-Gi-Oh! World Championship). Due to his poor performance, however, it was ended. After that he produced the elementary school students team named "Zaripai Japan", and it was started again.
Zarigani Pirate's Paper Comic Corner
Zaripai shows his short comics on the paper at the end of the corner when his crewmates get the paper from the writer. The paper can be downloaded from the homepages on the phones.

Akina's room
Akina Minami and Zarigani pirates talk with guests. It is parody of Tetsuko's Room, so Akina Minami speaks like Tetsuko Kuroyanagi.

Teach me, writers!
The writers answer the readers' questions. The questions change every month.

Theme songs
Opening theme: JumpClosing theme: Rotates depending on the currently featured anime

VomicVomic is a segment where voice actors lend their voices to characters from popular manga series. Some clips are published on the official Vomic'' website. The series that are featured on the program are rotated monthly.

External links
 Official website 
 Official Vomic website

References

Japanese variety television shows
TV Tokyo original programming
2009 Japanese television series debuts
Japanese children's television series